Timothy Clinton Bell is a New Zealand computer scientist, with interests in computer science education, computer music and text compression. In 2017, it was announced by SIGCSE that Bell would receive the 2018 award for 'Outstanding Contribution to Computer Science Education'.

Education
Bell was educated at Nelson College from 1975 to 1979. He completed his PhD at the University of Canterbury, with a thesis titled A unifying theory and improvements for existing approaches to text compression

Career and research
Bell joined the staff and rose to professor and head of department. In parallel with his academic work he has developed Computer Science Unplugged, a system of activities for teaching computer science without computers. The system was actively promoted by Google in 2007.

Selected works 
 Witten, Ian H., Alistair Moffat, Timothy C. Bell, Managing gigabytes: compressing and indexing documents and images. Morgan Kaufmann, 1999.
 Bell, Timothy C., John G. Cleary, and Ian H. Witten. Text compression. Prentice-Hall, Inc., 1990.
 Witten, Ian H., and Timothy C. Bell. "The zero-frequency problem: Estimating the probabilities of novel events in adaptive text compression." IEEE transactions on information theory 37, no. 4 (1991): 1085–1094.
 Ian H. Witten, Alistair Moffat, and Timothy C. Bell. Managing gigabytes: compressing and indexing documents and images. Morgan Kaufmann, 1999.
 Bell, Timothy, Ian H. Witten, and John G. Cleary. "Modeling for text compression." ACM Computing Surveys 21, no. 4 (1989): 557–591.

References

Living people
New Zealand computer scientists
University of Canterbury alumni
Academic staff of the University of Canterbury
People educated at Nelson College
Year of birth missing (living people)